Servius Cornelius Lentulus Maluginensis (died AD 23) was a Roman statesman, who flourished during the reigns of Augustus and Tiberius.  He was flamen dialis, and consul suffectus in AD 10.

Descent
Descended from the patrician Cornelia gens, Cornelius' father and grandfather were both named Gnaeus, and they belonged to the family of the Cornelii Lentuli, which first appears in Roman history during the fourth century BC.  Their relationship to other prominent members of the family is not immediately apparent. It is possibly that Cornelius' father was a quaestor in 29 BC; he also might be the same person with Gnaeus Cornelius Lentulus Augur. The surname Maluginensis was borne by the most ancient branch of the Cornelii, but had long since vanished from use; in Imperial times old cognomina were frequently revived.

Career
Cornelius' chief notability is for having been appointed flamen dialis, the high priest of Jupiter, at the direction of Augustus, after the position had been vacant for an unusually long period.  The precise date of his appointment is uncertain; Cassius Dio places it about 11 BC, which is accepted by many modern scholars.  But Tacitus states that he was appointed seventy-two years after the suicide of Lucius Cornelius Merula, the previous holder of the priesthood, in 87 BC.

In AD 10, Cornelius and Quintus Junius Blaesus, were appointed consul suffectus in the place of Publius Cornelius Dolabella and Gaius Junius Silanus.  Cornelius and Blaesus served from the kalends of July to the end of the year.  Twelve years later, Cornelius sought to be appointed governor of Asia for AD 22.  Such an appointment would have been typical for a consular such as Cornelius.  However, the emperor Tiberius asserted that the religious duties and obligations of the flamen dialis precluded his leaving Italy, and thus Cornelius was denied the governorship.  He died in AD 23, and his son, also named Servius, was appointed flamen dialis in his place.

See also
 Cornelia (gens)

Footnotes

References

Bibliography
 Publius Cornelius Tacitus, Annales.
 Cassius Dio, Roman History.
 Dictionary of Greek and Roman Biography and Mythology, William Smith, ed., Little, Brown and Company, Boston (1849).

1st-century BC births
23 deaths
1st-century BC Romans
1st-century Romans
Maluginensis, Servius
Flamines Dialis
Roman patricians
Suffect consuls of Imperial Rome
Year of birth uncertain